Alejo Cruz Techera (born 1 September 2000) is a Uruguayan professional footballer who plays as a winger for Danubio, on loan from Albion.

Career
Cruz is a youth academy graduate of Peñarol. In April 2021, he joined Racing Montevideo on a season long loan deal. He made his professional debut on 2 June 2021 in a 1–0 league win against Uruguay Montevideo.

In July 2022, Cruz terminated his contract with Peñarol and joined Albion. On 28 December 2022, he joined Danubio on loan for 2023 season.

Career statistics

Honours
Peñarol
 Supercopa Uruguaya: 2022

References

External links
 

2000 births
Living people
Footballers from Montevideo
Association football forwards
Uruguayan footballers
Uruguayan Primera División players
Uruguayan Segunda División players
Peñarol players
Racing Club de Montevideo players
Danubio F.C. players